The International Teqball Federation (FITEQ, French: Fédération Internationale de Teqball) is the governing body for the sport of teqball and para teqball. FITEQ is responsible for the organisation of teqball's major international tournaments, notably the Teqball World Championships.

FITEQ was founded in March 2017 following the sport's inception in 2014. Headquartered in Budapest, its membership now compromises 124 national federations.

FITEQ is responsible for the governance and management of teqball at the international level; the development and promotion of teqball globally; the codification of the official rules and regulations of teqball; supporting the establishment of National Federations; the education and development of athletes, coaches and technical officials; sanctioning national and international competitions and events; establishing and maintaining world-ranking statistics; and the governance, management and development of para teqball.

Board 
The FITEQ Board consists of FITEQ President Gábor Borsányi, who is the inventor of the sport, fellow co-founder and FITEQ Vice-President György Gattyán, teqball co-founder and FITEQ Chairman Viktor Huszár, General Secretary Marius Vizer Jr.The management team is led by Sport Director Matthew Curtain.

Member federations 
List of Member Federations

There are currently 130 national teqball member federations, across five continents.

Competitions

Teqball World Championships 
The annual Teqball World Championships (formerly Teqball World Cup) is the flagship teqball competition.

2017 Teqball World Cup 
The first edition of the event took place in Budapest, Hungary in 2017.

2018 Teqball World Cup 
The 2018 competition was held in Reims, France with 42 nations.

2019 Teqball World Championships 
The 2019 event was held in Budapest with 58 nations with a total of 160 athletes. Ádám Blázsovics won gold in both the singles and doubles competitions. He won the doubles gold with Csaba Bányik. The 2019 World Championships mixed doubles competition was won by Brazilian pair Natalia Guitler and Marcos Viera.

2020 Teqball World Championships 
The 2020 World Championships were postponed due to the impact of COVID-19. The next edition of the event will be held in 2021.

2021 Teqball World Championships 
The 2021 competition was held in Gliwice, Poland with 105 athletes from 32 nations.

2022 Teqball World Championships 
The 5th edition of the Teqball World Championships was held in Nuremberg, Germany with a record of 211 athletes from 55 nations. The venue of the event was Halle am Tillypark (KIA Metropol Arena).

Men Singles

Women Singles

Men's doubles

Women's doubles

Mixed doubles

Other major teqball events 
 The Sanya 2020 Asian Beach Games
 2021 Asian Indoor and Martial Arts Games 
 The African Beach Teqball Cup was held on 18 June 2019 during the 1st African Beach Games in Sal, Cape Verde.
 The Asia-Pacific Beach Cup took place in November 2019 as part of the Chinese Corporative Beach Games in Sanya.
 The inaugural Teqball Masters was held from 17 to 19 December 2019 in Riyadh, Saudi Arabia
 The Challenger Cup series began in September 2019 in Balassagyarmat, Hungary
 The National Challenger Series
 The Teqball Grand Prix
2023 European Games

World Rankings 
FITEQ has World Rankings for singles, doubles and mixed doubles, based on World Ranking points attained in official FITEQ events. FITEQ publishes regular updates to its World Rankings, which are used determine the seeding of players into tournaments. Last updated on: 12 May 2022

International Partners 

 Recognised by the Olympic Council of Asia (OCA) in August 2018
 Recognised by the Association of National Olympic Committees of Africa (ANOCA) in June 2019. 
Recognised by Organisation of Sports Federations of Oceania (OSFO)
 Signatory of the United Nations Framework Convention on Climate Change 
Global Association of International Sports Federations (GAISF) Full Member 
 Partner of the International Testing Agency
 Partner with the International School Sport Federation (ISF)
Signatory of the World Anti-Doping (WADA) Code 
 Content partner with the Olympic Channel
 Media partner with Eurosport
 Partnership with the Hungarian Paralympic Committee (MPB)
Recognised and endorsed by TAFISA

References

External links 
 International Teqball Federation
 FITEQ Online Education

Teqball
Organisations based in Budapest
Federations